In mathematics, an automorphic factor is a certain type of analytic function,  defined on subgroups of SL(2,R), appearing in the theory of modular forms. The general case, for general groups, is reviewed in the article 'factor of automorphy'.

Definition
An automorphic factor of weight k is a function

satisfying the four properties given below.  Here, the notation  and  refer to the upper half-plane and the complex plane, respectively. The notation  is a subgroup of SL(2,R), such as, for example, a Fuchsian group. An element  is a 2×2 matrix

with a, b, c, d real numbers, satisfying ad−bc=1.

An automorphic factor must satisfy:

Properties
Every automorphic factor may be written as 

with 

The function  is called a multiplier system.  Clearly,

, 
while, if , then

which equals  when k is an integer.

References
 Robert Rankin, Modular Forms and Functions, (1977) Cambridge University Press . (Chapter 3 is entirely devoted to automorphic factors for the modular group.)

Modular forms